Andrei Mitrofanovich Ryabykh (born 16 May 1982) is a former Russian football player.

He represented Russia at the 1999 UEFA European Under-16 Championship.

External links
 

1982 births
Living people
Place of birth missing (living people)
Russian footballers
Association football midfielders
FC Olimpia Volgograd players
Russian expatriate footballers
Expatriate footballers in Ukraine
FC Arsenal Kyiv players
Ukrainian Premier League players
FC CSKA Kyiv players
FC Elista players